Chega de Saudade is the debut album by Brazilian musician João Gilberto and is often credited as the first bossa nova album.  The title can be translated roughly as "enough with longing", though the Portuguese word saudade carries with it more complex meaning.

In 2001, the album was inducted into the Grammy Hall of Fame. In the same year, it was made an inaugural member of the Latin Grammy Hall of Fame. It was listed by Rolling Stone Brazil as the fourth best Brazilian album in history.

By the time of the album's release, newspaper O Estado de S. Paulo stated that Gilberto "is one of the most musical of our popular singers, a certainty which broadly compensates for his lack of volume. In this regard, it is worth noting his interpretation of 'Desafinado'. Besides, he reveals an unorthodox good taste for the choice of melodies recorded in this first LP and a sobriety in interpretation we have rarely observed".

Track listing

CD bonus tracks 
 "A Felicidade (Happiness)" (Antônio Carlos Jobim, Vinícius de Moraes) - João Gilberto 
 "Manhã de Carnaval (Morning of the Carnival)" (Luiz Bonfá, Antônio Maria, Maria Bonfa) - João Gilberto
 "O nosso amor (Our Love)" (Antônio Carlos Jobim, Vinícius de Moraes) - João Gilberto
 "Chega de saudade" (Antônio Carlos Jobim, Vinícius de Moraes) - Elizete Cardoso
 "Chega de saudade" (Antônio Carlos Jobim, Vinícius de Moraes) - Os Cariocas
 "Lobo bobo" (Carlos Lyra, Ronaldt Boscoli) - Alaide Costa
 "Lobo bobo" (Carlos Lyra, Ronaldt Boscoli) - Walter Wanderley
 "Hô-bá-lá-lá" (João Gilberto) - Walter Wanderley
 "Hô-bá-lá-lá" (João Gilberto) - Norma Bengell
 "Hô-bá-lá-lá" (João Gilberto) - Bene Nunes
 "Maria ninguém" (Carlos Lyra) - Bola Sete
 "Minha saudade" (My Longing)" (João Gilberto, João Donato) - Bola Sete
 "Minha saudade" (My Longing)" (João Gilberto, João Donato) - Alaide Costa
 "Minha saudade" (My Longing)" (João Gilberto, João Donato) - João Donato

References 

1959 debut albums
João Gilberto albums
Bossa nova albums
Grammy Hall of Fame Award recipients
Portuguese-language albums
Albums produced by Antônio Carlos Jobim
Latin Grammy Hall of Fame Award recipients
Odeon Records albums